Onbathu Kuzhi Sampath is a 2020 Indian Tamil-language romantic drama film written and directed by Ja. Raghupathy. It is produced by 80-20 Pictures and stars Balaji Maharaja, Nikhila Vimal, and Appukutty. The film began production in 2016, but was delayed and released in 2020. The film is based on Onbathu Kuzhi, a village game that involves marbles. Balaji Maharaja plays a man who is an expert at the game while  Nikhila Vimal portrays a village woman. Nikhila Vimal shot for this film while shooting for Vetrivel and Kidaari. The film released on Regal Talkies, a TVOD app. on 15 August 2020. This is the first Tamil feature film to be telecast on a pay-per-view model.

Plot 
The story begins in Trichy and shows Sampath working in a quaint workshop and heading back to his village with loads of money in his hand to marry his lady love Vasanthi.

The film goes into a flashback. Sampath, a major headache to the villagers, whiles away his time playing the nine-hole marble game, drinking, and creating nuisances. His life changes when Vasanthi, who does not normally speak to anyone in the village, starts a chance conversation with him. This one reason was enough for Sampath to fall in love. This love was naturally unwelcome. To impress Vasanthi and her family, Sampath tidies himself and steps into her home to ask for her hand. Vasanthi's family is flabbergasted and blames and doubts Vasanthi for the development. To make her family believe that she is not party to his act, she decides to do what her family asks her to do. Vasanthi insults Sampath in front of the villagers during the village festival.

Sampath is taken aback. He feels insulted and locks himself within the four walls of his home. He even attempts suicide but stops at the last moment as he thinks this act of his would hurt Vasanthi more. Sampath's friend Saami is worried with this development, and not able to see his friend in this state, confronts Vasanthi. Vasanthi is now moved by this and feels sorry for her act which saved her and her family prestige but spoiled Sampath's reputation and prestige. She speaks to Sampath and makes him come out of depression, and now both fall in love. To give Vasanthi a decent life and make her parents accept their love, Sampath decides to leave the village and move to the city to earn money. They both hide their love with themselves.

The flashback ends, and Sampath visits his home after two years. He is asked about the whereabouts of Vasanthi and is shell shocked. What happened to Vasanthi forms the climax.

On the day of parting, Durai sees Sampath and Vasanthi together, and this angers him. He hits her with the torch, and the blow takes Vasanthi's life. On hearing the commotion, neighbours knock the door. Vislatchi opens the door and says her daughter has eloped with Sampath. She does this to safe guard the family's honour and prestige. They cremate Vasanthi's body in the backyard. This truth surfaces. Sampath starts living with the thoughts of Vasanthi.

Cast 
Balaji Maharaja as Sampath
Nikhila Vimal as Vasanthi
Appukutty as Saami
Meenakshi
Indhran
Bhagyashree
Lakshmi Chintamani
Dhandapani
Suruli Manohar

Soundtrack 
The songs are composed by Va Charlie.

Release 
The film was scheduled to release on 24 July 2020 before the release was delayed to 15 August 2020, hence coinciding with Indian Independence Day.

Reception 
The Times of India gave the film a rating of one-and-a-half out of five stars and noted that "For most parts of the film, his characters remain generic and we are hardly surprised by their actions". The Hindu Tamil Thisai praised the performances of the lead cast, but criticized the lack of romantic scenes needed for films in the romantic genre. Dinamalar gave the film a rating of two-and-a-quarter out of five stars.

References

External links 

2020s Tamil-language films
Indian romantic drama films
2020 romantic drama films